Gérald Paul Maquat (born 15 July 1912) was a French rower. He competed in the men's coxed four event at the 1948 Summer Olympics.

References

External links
 

1912 births
Year of death missing
French male rowers
Olympic rowers of France
Rowers at the 1948 Summer Olympics
Swiss emigrants to France